Rock of Ages: The DVD Collection is a DVD featuring music videos by Def Leppard. This one-disc collection contains a total of 19 commercial single videos that helped jump the band to success after the release of their breakthrough 1983 album, Pyromania. Only one video featured on the compilation, "Bringin' On the Heartbreak", was not released after Pyromania.

This DVD collection was released alongside its own compilation CD album Rock of Ages: The Definitive Collection, which included various songs that were not released as singles and singles that did not have music videos made for them.

Track list
 "Pour Some Sugar on Me"
 "Photograph"
 "Love Bites"
 "Let's Get Rocked"
 "Two Steps Behind"
 "Animal"
 "Foolin'"
 "Rocket"
 "When Love & Hate Collide"
 "Armageddon It"
 "Have You Ever Needed Someone So Bad"
 "Rock of Ages"
 "Hysteria"
 "Bringin' On the Heartbreak" *
 "Promises"
 "Women"
 "Slang"
 "Work It Out"
 "Now"

Note: *The video for "Bringin' On the Heartbreak" is the Phil Collen version (taped in 1984), however, the audio is the original Pete Willis version (1981). This may have been done on purpose for the Greatest Hits collection to merge the more popular version of the song with the more well-known music video.

Extra features
 "No Matter What" (Rehearsal video)
 Track-by-track commentary by the entire band
 Personal playlist option

Certifications

References

Def Leppard video albums
2005 video albums
Music video compilation albums
Def Leppard compilation albums
2005 compilation albums